The Bay Parkway station (formerly Bay Parkway–22nd Avenue station) is an express station on the BMT West End Line of the New York City Subway, located in Bensonhurst, Brooklyn at the intersection of Bay Parkway and 86th Street. The station is served by the D train at all times.

History 
Bay Parkway opened on July 29, 1916, as part of an extension of the BMT West End Line from 18th Avenue to 25th Avenue. The line was originally a surface excursion railway to Coney Island, called the Brooklyn, Bath and Coney Island Railroad, which was established in 1862, but did not reach Coney Island until 1864. Under the Dual Contracts of 1913, an elevated line was built over New Utrecht Avenue, 86th Street and Stillwell Avenue, replacing the surface railway.

This station was the southern terminal for M service during rush hours until June 28, 2010.

In 2012, the station was rehabilitated and three passenger elevators (one from each platform to the mezzanine, and one from the mezzanine to street level) were added with funding from the American Recovery and Reinvestment Act of 2009.

Station layout

This elevated station has two island platforms and three tracks. The center track is not normally used in revenue service. Both platforms have brown canopies with green frames and support columns in their center as well as wooden benches surrounded by green windscreens. On either sides, there are windscreen-style station signs and round lampposts. There is a signal tower at the south end of the station, at the end of the northbound platform.

This station was the terminus for the M train from 1987 to 2010 during rush hours. Although both platforms had signs indicating M trains used the center express track, they actually operated from the local tracks because there are no switches north of the station to allow trains to switch to the express track. South of the platforms, two diamond crossovers were used for M trains to relay or be stored on the center track before switching to the Manhattan-bound local one for the trip northbound.

A concrete structure was built over the steel at this station. On July 6, 2005, it was listed on the National Register of Historic Places.

Exits
This station has one metal station house with concrete floors below the platforms and tracks. Two staircases from each platform go down to a waiting area/crossover, where a turnstile bank provides access to and from the station. Outside fare control, there is a token booth and four staircases going down to all corners of Bay Parkway and 86th Street. The station house formerly had windows on all four sides. However, all of them except the ones on the west side have been covered with tar.

Gallery

References

External links 

 
 Station Reporter — D Train
 Bay Parkway entrance from Google Maps Street View
 Platforms from Google Maps Street View

BMT West End Line stations
Railway and subway stations on the National Register of Historic Places in New York City
New York City Subway stations in Brooklyn
Railway stations in the United States opened in 1916
1916 establishments in New York City
National Register of Historic Places in Brooklyn